Carpe diem is Lara Fabian's second French album released in 1994.
The album sold more than 250,000 copies.

Track listing

Charts

Certifications

References

External links

1994 albums
Lara Fabian albums